William Barton is an Aboriginal Australian didgeridoo player. He was born in Mount Isa, Queensland on 4 June 1981 and learned to play from his uncle, an elder of the Wannyi, Lardil and Kalkadunga tribes of Western Queensland. He is widely recognised as one of Australia's finest traditional didgeridoo players and a leading didgeridoo player in the classical world.

"I'm doing what I love," Barton says. "I want to take the oldest culture in the world and blend it with Europe's rich musical legacy."

Barton has been featured on the ABC television program, Australian Story.

Life for William Barton
Taught to play the didgeridoo from an early age by Aboriginal Elders, by the age of 12 Barton was working in Sydney, playing for Aboriginal dance troupes. At the age of 15 he toured America, after which he decided he wanted to become a soloist rather than a backing musician and started to study different kinds of music. In 1998, he made his classical debut with the Queensland Symphony Orchestra, and became Australia's first didgeridoo artist-in-residence with a symphony orchestra.

In November 2022, Barton was named Queensland Australian of the Year.

Performances
Barton has appeared at music festivals around the world and has also recorded a number of orchestral works. He featured in Peter Sculthorpe's Requiem, a major work for orchestra, chorus and didgeridoo, which premiered the Adelaide Festival of Arts in 2004 with the Adelaide Symphony Orchestra and Adelaide Voices conducted by Richard Mills. This was reputedly the first time a didgeridoo has featured in a full symphonic work. The work has since been performed in the UK at The Lichfield Festival with The City of Birmingham Symphony Orchestra and Birmingham's choir Ex Cathedra, conducted by Jeffrey Skidmore.

In May 2004, ABC Classics released Songs of Sea and Sky, an album of works by Peter Sculthorpe revised for didgeridoo and orchestra. Performed by Barton and the Queensland Orchestra conducted by Michael Christie.

In 2005, Barton performed at the 90th anniversary Gallipoli at ANZAC Cove, Turkey, and in debut concerts with the London Philharmonic Orchestra at Royal Festival Hall in London. In 2005/2006, Barton collaborated with orchestras, choral directors and composers in Australia, America and Europe, developing new commissions for the didgeridoo.

On 5 November 2014, Barton performed at the memorial service for former Prime Minister Gough Whitlam in the Sydney Town Hall.

In 2015, Barton performed at the 100th anniversary opening Gallipoli at ANZAC Cove, Turkey for dawn service.

In 2019, Barton played with the Sydney Symphony Orchestra an orchestral rendition of Down Under at the memorial service for former Prime Minister Bob Hawke at the Sydney Opera House.

Discography

Albums

Awards and nominations
Barton was jointly selected with pianist Tamara Anna Cislowska for the 2004 Freedman Fellowship for Classical Music by the Music Council of Australia.

In 2004, he was awarded the Brisbane Lord Mayor's Young and Emerging Artists' Fellowship, and the following year he was a metropolitan finalist for the Suncorp Young Queenslander of the Year Award.

APRA Music Awards

The APRA Awards are held in Australia and New Zealand by the Australasian Performing Right Association to recognise songwriting skills, sales and airplay performance by its members annually.

! 
|-
| 2022
| "Spirit Voice of the Enchanted Waters" from River  (William Barton, Piers Burbrook de Vere & Richard Tognetti)
| Best Original Song Composed for the Screen
| 
| 
|-
|}

ARIA Music Awards
The ARIA Music Awards is an annual awards ceremony that recognises excellence, innovation, and achievement across all genres of Australian music. They commenced in 1987.

! 
|-
| 2004
| Sculthorpe: Songs of Sea and Sky (with The Queensland Orchestra)
| Best Classical Album
| 
| 
|-
| 2012
| Kalkadungu
| Best Classical Album
| 
| 
|-
| 2014
| Birdsong at Dusk
| Best World Music Album
| 
| 
|-
| 2021
| Restless Dream (with Bob Weatherall & Halfway)
| Best World Music Album
| 
| 
|-
| rowspan="2"|  2022
| Heartland 
| rowspan="2"|  Best World Music Album
| 
| rowspan="2"| 
|-
| History Has a Heartbeat 
|

Don Banks Music Award
The Don Banks Music Award was established in 1984 to publicly honour a senior artist of high distinction who has made an outstanding and sustained contribution to music in Australia. It was founded by the Australia Council in honour of Don Banks, Australian composer, performer and the first chair of its music board.

|-
| 2021
| William Barton
| Don Banks Music Award
| 
|-

Environmental Music Prize
The Environmental Music Prize is a quest to find a theme song to inspire action on climate and conservation. It commenced in 2022.

! 
|-
| 2022
| "Your Country" (William Crighton featuring William Barton & Julieanne Crighton)
| Environmental Music Prize
| 
| 
|-

References

Profile Arts in Australia website.

External links
 Official site
 , Queensland Conservatorium 2004
 , Brisbane Music Festival 2006]
 2013 live performance of SCULTHORPE (b.1929) Earth Cry on AYO Website

1981 births
ARIA Award winners
Living people
Didgeridoo players
Indigenous Australian musicians
Contemporary classical music performers
Australian classical musicians
People from Mount Isa